The Palace of the Dukes and Estates of Burgundy or Palais des ducs et des États de Bourgogne is a remarkably well-preserved architectural assemblage in Dijon. The oldest part is the 14th and 15th century Gothic ducal palace and seat of the Dukes of Burgundy, made up of a logis still visible on place de la Liberation, the ducal kitchens on cour de Bar, the tour de Philippe le Bon, a "guette" overlooking the whole city, and tour de Bar. Most of what can be seen today, however, was built in the 17th and especially the 18th centuries, in a classical style, when the palace was a royal residence building and housed the estates of Burgundy. Finally, the 19th façade of the musée on place de la Sainte-Chapelle was added on the site of the palace's Sainte-Chapelle, demolished in 1802. The Palace houses the city's town hall and the musée des Beaux-Arts.

History of the Palace of the Dukes 

The Duchy of Burgundy was founded in the 9th century, around the year 880, from the Kingdom of Burgundy by the Carolingian kings of France, Louis III and Carloman II, and the Princes who shared the Carolingian Empire, after reorganizing the entire kingdom into duchies and counties.
Richard, Count of Autun, known as "Richard the Justiciar", was named the first Margrave and Duke of Burgundy. He was one of the six in the French Peerage installed under his suzerain, King Louis III of France.

The Duke Residence

The Dukes of Burgundy ruler of the Duchy of Burgundy (1363–1477) 
 Philip the Bold (1342–1404), son of the King John II of France
 John the Fearless (1371–1419)
 Philip the Good (1396–1467)
 Charles the Bold (1433–1477)

Palace of the Estates of Burgundy
The palace turned into a Royal residence when the Duchy of Burgundy was occupied by the Kingdom of France after the death of Charles the Bold, in 1477, and the treaty of Arras of 1482 between the king Louis XI and Maximilian I, Holy Roman Emperor.

Governors of Burgundy
After 1477, the kings of France named governors to rule Burgundy. Sometimes they came personally to Dijon, where the palace was turned into a royal residence to receive them while in the province of Burgundy.

The palace during the revolution: birth of the museum

The palace today 

The restored ducal tombs were installed in the Salle de garde following the razing of the Chartreuse de Champmol in the nineteenth century. During the 2010–12 renovation of the palace, a number of sculptures from the tombs travelled on exhibition.

See also 
 Musée des Beaux-Arts de Dijon
 Dukes of Burgundy
 Dijon

References

External links 
 
 Official Site of the Musée des Beaux-Arts de Dijon

Châteaux in Côte-d'Or
History of Dijon
Buildings and structures in Dijon
Tourist attractions in Dijon
Palaces in France